We Are the People We've Been Waiting For is a 2009 documentary film directed  by Daryl Goodrich and produced by Caroline Rowland.  It explores the education system in the UK and asks whether the current system provides young people with the opportunity to develop their talents.

Synopsis
We Are the People We've Been Waiting For was inspired and guided by producer Lord Puttnam, and focuses on the educational experiences of five young people in Swindon, England.   The film examines three pillars on which the current education system globally is built: curriculum, testing, and teaching. It observed how millions of young people are essentially being failed by the system and explores alternative ways of tapping into the talent that exist in the rising generation.

Cast
 Tony Blair
 Richard Branson
 David Bryant
 Bill Clinton
 Natasha Cooper
 Germaine Greer
 Scott Harflett
 Sandra Leaton Gray
 Ken Robinson
 Amy Scott
 Henry Winkler

References

External links
 Official movie website
 

2009 films
2009 documentary films
British documentary films
2000s English-language films
2000s British films
English-language documentary films